Ivan Galád  (born 10 April 1963) is a Slovak football manager and former player, who is the head coach of FC ViOn Zlaté Moravce.

He previously managed Slovakia's national under-21 team.

Honours

Manager
FC Nitra
DOXXbet liga: Winners : 2004–05 (Promoted)
DOXXbet liga: Runners-Up: 2016–17 (Promoted)

Slovakia U21
UEFA European Under-21 Championship Play-off: 2013, 2015

References

External links

Ivan Galad at Footballdatabase
at Futbalnet 

1963 births
Living people
Sportspeople from Krupina
Slovak footballers
Slovak football managers
MFK Lokomotíva Zvolen players
MFK Lokomotíva Zvolen managers
FC Senec managers
AS Trenčín managers
FC Nitra managers
MFK Ružomberok managers
FK Iskra Borčice managers
FC ViOn Zlaté Moravce managers
Slovak Super Liga managers
2. Liga (Slovakia) managers
Slovakia national under-21 football team managers
Association footballers not categorized by position